JoAnne R. Sellar (born 1963) is an English film producer. She has collaborated with Paul Thomas Anderson on each of his films with the exception of his first.

Filmography
She was producer for all films unless otherwise noted.

Film

Thanks

Television

Miscellaneous crew

References

External links

Living people
1963 births
British women film producers
English film producers